Lucy Wicks may refer to:

 Lucy Wicks (politician) (born 1973), Australian politician
 Lucy Wicks (volleyball) (born 1982), British volleyballer